Eolo is the first compressed air car invented by Guy Nègre and built by Motor Development International (MDI) which has licensed the patent for the construction to Eolo International (in Italy to Eolo Italia). It was unveiled during the 2001 Bologna Motor Show car and bike fair. An attempt to put it into production failed in 2003.

How it works
The Compressed Air Engine (CAE) utilizes air expansion as an energy source by releasing compressed air from tanks with an extremely cold internal temperature and high pressure, about 300 Bar. The resulting air expansion is used to move a piston or turbine and turn the crankshaft.

The Eolo car would use electricity and the air around the car to re-fill the compressed air tanks, which could take up to two hours.

Facts
 Not one was ever built by the factory.
 It actually has an exhaust tube from which only cold air (-20° Celsius) comes out.

Specialities
It is claimed to be a zero-emissions vehicle. The only problem is the recharging, but if the energy is produced solely via renewable resources such as wind, geothermal power or solar power, the emission is zero. On the other hand, most electricity worldwide is made by burning coal, oil or natural gas, or from nuclear energy.

Problems
Production should have begun in 2003 in Broni (Italy), but for unspecified problems, the MDI company was unable to build or sell it in the Italian-European market, or indeed anywhere. The 90 employees, who were supposed to begin production, were from 2003 to 2005 under the "cassa integrazione" law, an Italian law which provides, through state benefits, the payroll to employees who, for special reasons due to the employers, are unable to perform their jobs. They were then fired.

Though the prototype was a complete success (the engine was even sold as a power generator with zero emissions) the selling of this car is said to be artificially postponed or cancelled due to undeclared reasons.

However, it is very likely that the air decompression, and the consequent drop in temperature, causes the natural humidity to condense as ice in the engine, eventually stopping it in minutes.

There have been several attempts to interview and have a declaration from the Eolo Italia president, but up to now no one has been successful.

See also 
 Air car
 Air engine
 Cyril Guy Nègre

References

External links 
 MDI 
 Eolo's problems 

Compressed air power
Proposed vehicles